Sibert may refer to:

Sibert, Kentucky
Sibert Medal for most distinguished informational book for children
Franklin C. Sibert, U.S. Army major general of World Wars I and II
William L. Sibert (1860–1935), U.S. Army major general
Camp Sibert, Alabama, a WWII U.S. Army chemical weapons training facility